XHTML+MathML+SVG is a W3C standard that describes an integration of MathML and Scalable Vector Graphics semantics with XHTML and Cascading Style Sheets.  It is categorized as "obsolete" on the W3C's HTML Current Status page.

References

External links 
 W3C Working Draft

World Wide Web Consortium standards